Agroeca is a genus of liocranid sac spiders that was first described by Niklas Westring in 1861.

Species
 it contains thirty-five species, found in Africa, Asia, Europe, North America, Colombia, and Peru:
Agroeca agrestis Ponomarev, 2007 – Kazakhstan
Agroeca angirasu Zamani & Marusik, 2021 - Iran
Agroeca annulipes Simon, 1878 – Spain, France (Corsica), Italy (Sardinia), Morocco, Algeria
Agroeca aureoplumata Keyserling, 1879 – Colombia
Agroeca batangensis Mu, Jin & Zhang, 2019 – China
Agroeca bonghwaensis Seo, 2011 – Korea
Agroeca brunnea (Blackwall, 1833) – Europe, Turkey, Russia (Europe to Far East), China, Japan
Agroeca coreana Namkung, 1989 – Russia (Far East), China, Korea, Japan
Agroeca cuprea Menge, 1873 – Europe, Caucasus, Russia (Europe to South Siberia), Central Asia
Agroeca debilis O. Pickard-Cambridge, 1885 – China (Yarkand)
Agroeca dentigera Kulczyński, 1913 – Europe, Turkey, China
Agroeca dubiosissima (Strand, 1908) – Peru
Agroeca flavens O. Pickard-Cambridge, 1885 – China (Yarkand)
Agroeca gangotrae Biswas & Roy, 2008 – India
Agroeca guttulata Simon, 1897 – Central Asia
Agroeca inopina O. Pickard-Cambridge, 1886 – Europe, Algeria
Agroeca kamurai Hayashi, 1992 – China, Japan
Agroeca kastoni Chamberlin & Ivie, 1944 – USA
Agroeca lata Mu, Jin & Zhang, 2019 – China
Agroeca lusatica (L. Koch, 1875) – Europe, Russia (Europe to South Siberia), Kazakhstan
Agroeca maculata L. Koch, 1879 – Russia (Europe to Far East), Kazakhstan
Agroeca maghrebensis Bosmans, 1999 – Morocco, Algeria, Tunisia
Agroeca mainlingensis Mu, Jin & Zhang, 2019 – China
Agroeca makarovae Esyunin, 2008 – Russia (Europe)
Agroeca minuta Banks, 1895 – USA
Agroeca mongolica Schenkel, 1936 – Mongolia, China, Korea
Agroeca montana Hayashi, 1986 – Russia (Far East), China, Korea, Japan
Agroeca nigra Mu, Jin & Zhang, 2019 – China
Agroeca ornata Banks, 1892 – USA, Canada, Russia (Middle Siberia to Far East)
Agroeca parva Bosmans, 2011 – Greece, Turkey, Israel
Agroeca pratensis Emerton, 1890 – USA, Canada
Agroeca proxima (O. Pickard-Cambridge, 1871) (type) – Europe, Turkey, Russia (Europe to South Siberia)
Agroeca spinifera Kaston, 1938 – USA
Agroeca trivittata (Keyserling, 1887) – USA
Agroeca tumida Mu, Jin & Zhang, 2019 – China

See also
 List of Liocranidae species

Gallery

References

Araneomorphae genera
Corinnidae
Cosmopolitan spiders
Liocranidae